Disney Club is the name of many television shows associated to Disney productions aired mostly in Europe and the Americas during the 1990s and early 2000s (decade).

Americas 
 Brazil: aired from April 28, 1997, to December 28, 2002, on SBT, starring Leonardo Monteiro, Diego Ramiro, Caíque Benigno, Jussara Marques, Danielle Lima and Murilo Troccoli
 Mexico: named Disney Club, aired from 1998 on Azteca 7 (TV Azteca). The show was renewed in 2001 with a new format and animated series.
 Ecuador: named Disney Club, aired on Teleamazonas
 Chile: named El Club Disney, aired on Canal 13
 Colombia: named Tu Hora Disney, aired on Cadena Uno (Canal 1)

Europe 
 France: aired on TF1 from 7 January 1990 to 27 December 1998
 Germany: aired between 1991 and 1995 on ARD, then 1996–2001 on RTL
 Greece: aired on Mega Channel from November 1993 to July 2002
 Serbia: aired on Happy TV during 2016
 Russia: aired on Channel One from 4 January 1998 to 9 March 2014
 Italy: aired on Rai 1 (from 1991 to 2000) and Rai 2 (from 2000 to 2006) 
 Netherlands: aired on NCRV from 1989 to 1992
 United Kingdom: The Disney Club aired between 1989 and 1998 on ITV
 Ukraine: aired on NLO TV from 1 January 2019 to 11 July 2022
 Sweden: named Disneyklubben, aired from August 27, 1992, to December 31, 1993, on SVT1 and was hosted by Alice Bah, Eva Röse, and Johan Petersson.
 Ireland: Disney Club is currently aired on RTÉ Two
 Portugal: named Clube Disney aired on 1991–1994 on Canal 1, 1996–2001 on RTP2 and RTP1
 Spain: named Club Disney, aired on 1991–1998 on TVE 1, 1998–2003 on Telecinco, 2003–2007 (renamed as Zona Disney) again on TVE 1
 Romania: named Clubul Disney, aired on 2004-2013 on TVR 1

Asia 
 India: aired in 1995 on DD Metro
 Indonesia: aired from 1996 to 2006 on Indosiar, from 2010 to 2020 on RCTI and MNCTV
 Philippines: aired on TV5 from 2010 as a cartoon block
 Thailand: aired on BBTV CH 7 HD from 1992 to 2021

See also 
 The Mickey Mouse Club

References

1990s animated television series
2000s animated television series
Television series by Disney